CD Type Thing is the first album by American punk rock band Big Drill Car, released in 1989. Many consider this album to be a classic of the late '80s hardcore punk scene, and the peak of Big Drill Car's career.

The title of the album changed with the format it was presented on: the compact disc version was entitled CD Type Thing, the vinyl format was called Album Type Thing, and the audio cassette version was called Tape Type Thing. The gimmick is similar to that of Public Image Ltd.'s 1986 album, Album.

Like many Big Drill Car albums, CD Type Thing is currently out of print.

Track listing
(All tracks written by Arnold, Daly unless noted otherwise)

"16 Lines" (Arnold, Daly, Thomson) – 2:52
"Clamato #11" (Daly) – 1:30
"No Need" – 2:52
"Brody" (Arnold, Daly, Thomson) – 2:56
"In Green Fields" – 2:19
"Diamond Earrings" – 3:24
"Reform Before" (Daly) – 2:11
"Head On" (Daly, Thomson) – 2:21
"Swanson" (Arnold, Daly, Thomson) – 1:35
"About Us" – 2:13

Personnel
Frank Daly - Vocals 
Mark Arnold - Guitar  
Bob Thomson - Bass, Art Direction, Artwork
Danny Marcroft - drums 
Additional personnel
Stephen Egerton - Producer 
Richard Andrews - Engineer, Producer

References 

1989 debut albums
Big Drill Car albums
Cruz Records albums